The Stade Communal du Tivoli is a multi-use stadium in La Louvière, Belgium. It is currently used mostly for football matches. It was the home ground of R.A.A. Louviéroise. The stadium holds 12,500 people  and was built in 1972. UR La Louvière Centre are its current tenants.

References

Multi-purpose stadiums in Belgium
Football venues in Wallonia
Sports venues in Hainaut (province)
Sport in La Louvière
La Louvière